USD Coin (USDC) is  digital stablecoin pegged to the United States dollar. USD Coin is managed by a consortium called Centre, which was founded by Circle and includes members from the cryptocurrency exchange Coinbase and Bitcoin mining company Bitmain, an investor in Circle. USDC is issued by a private entity and should not be confused with a central bank digital currency (CBDC).

Usage 
USDC is primarily available as an Ethereum ERC-20 token, and on blockchains including Hedera Hashgraph, Algorand, Avalanche, Solana, Stellar, Polygon, and TRON.

Reserves 
Circle claims that each USDC is backed by a dollar held in reserve, or by other "approved investments", though these are not detailed. The wording on the Circle website changed from the previous "backed by US dollars" to "backed by fully reserved assets" in June 2021.

USDC reserves are regularly attested (but not audited) by Grant Thornton, LLP, and the monthly attestations can be found on the Centre Consortium's website.

History 
USDC was first announced on 15 May 2018 by Circle, and was launched in September 2018. 

On March 29, 2021, Visa announced that it would allow the use of USDC to settle transactions on its payment network.

, Circle states that there are 55 billion USDC in circulation.

On March 11, 2023, USDC lost its peg to the dollar after Circle confirmed $3.3 billion, approximately 8% of its reserves, were at risk due to the collapse of Silicon Valley Bank that occurred the previous day.

See also
Jeremy Allaire
Tether (cryptocurrency)

References

External links 

Cryptocurrencies
Ethereum tokens
2018 establishments
Currencies introduced in 2018
Blockchains
Cryptocurrency projects